A list of films produced in Italy in 1939 (see 1939 in film):

See also
List of Italian films of 1938
List of Italian films of 1940

References

External links
Italian films of 1939 at the Internet Movie Database

Italian
1939
Films